Proceratophrys is a genus of frogs in the family Odontophrynidae. They are found in eastern and southern Brazil, northeastern Argentina, and Paraguay, possibly into Bolivia adjacent to the Brazilian border.

Species
The genus contains 42 species, many of them only recently described:

References

 
Odontophrynidae
Amphibians of South America
Taxonomy articles created by Polbot